Roger Dicken (born 1939) is a British special effects artist. He was nominated for an Academy Award in the category Best Visual Effects for the film When Dinosaurs Ruled the Earth.

Selected filmography 

 Scars of Dracula (1970, bat puppet)
 When Dinosaurs Ruled the Earth (1971; co-nominated for an Academy Award with Jim Danforth)
 The Land That Time Forgot (1974)
 Warlords of Atlantis (1978)
 Alien (1979, chest burster effects)

References

External links 

1939 births
Living people
Place of birth missing (living people)
Special effects people